Canillejas is a station on Line 5 of the Madrid Metro. It is located in fare Zone A.

Canillejas serves an interurban bus station for buses towards Alcalá de Henares, Torrejón de Ardoz and Guadalajara, Castile-La Mancha. It also used to be the terminus of Line 5 from 1980 until 2006, when the extension towards Alameda de Osuna was opened.

References 

Line 5 (Madrid Metro) stations
Railway stations in Spain opened in 1980